Suryoyo Sat is an Aramaic language TV channel broadcasting from Södertälje, Sweden. The channel is broadcast to more than 80 countries.

Suryoyo Sat's programming is mainly conducted in Turoyo Neo-Aramaic and to a lesser extent in English and Arabic.

Manipulation scandal
In April 2013, the Södertälje-based daily newspaper Länstidningen (LT) accused Suryoyo SAT of manipulation of a photo taken during Abdullah Güls, then President of Turkey, visit in Sweden. In the picture, where Gül poses with a Syriac Orthodox archbishop and a number of representatives  from the Assyrian and Syriac-Aramaic federations in Sweden, Suryoyo SAT replaced one of the Assyrian representatives with a Syriac-Aramaic one. Two days later, Suryoyo SAT apologized for the incident, saying that the involved persons had been warned.

See also
ANB SAT
Ishtar TV
KBSV
Suroyo TV

References

External links
Suryoyo Sat
Suryoyo Sat Germany
Suryoyo Sat Netherlands

Aramaic-language television channels
Television channels in Sweden
Television channels and stations established in 2006
2006 establishments in Sweden